In the 2022–23 season, USM Alger are competing in the Ligue 1 for the 45th season, as well as the Algerian Cup and Confederation Cup. It is their 28th consecutive season in the top flight of Algerian football. They are competing in Ligue 1, the Algerian Cup and Confederation Cup.

Season summary
On 26 June 2022, Sid Ahmed Arab has succeeded Achour Djelloul who has been imprisoned, as the new president of the club. Reda Abdouche has been appointed as the new general director, this was his second time after 2011.  On July 6, 2022, Jamil Benouahi extended his contract for another year to remain the head coach for the new season. On July 21, in the first press conference Reda Abdouche spoke about the club's goals and the recruitment file, the first questions were about the departure of some players, Abdouche stated that he did not reach a month in his position. Where stated that during the spare period in the club, some players decided to sign up for other clubs, such as goalkeeper Alexis Guendouz and there are players that the technical staff decided not to enter in their plans, most notably Hamza Koudri who has been in the club for ten years. Abdouche stated that it is an adventure to rely on a player who suffered from an injury in Cruciate ligament that kept him out of the field for a year and at his age especially since he's at the end of his contract. As for contracts, Abdouche stated that they contacted players, including former players in the club, and although they promised to sign, they refused to answer their calls and joined other clubs. He also said that they will not pay billions to buy player contracts and that this is not the club's policy and the rest of the clubs are free if they want to, Regarding the stadium, Abdouche said that the interests of the municipality APC and the National Authority for Technical Control of Construction CTC said that Omar Hamadi Stadium poses a danger to the supporters and it was decided to close it and they would play either at Salem Mabrouki Stadium or Omar Benrabah Stadium, especially with the closure of Stade du 5 Juillet until January due to CHAN 2022.

On August 1, 2022, USM Alger delegation expected to move to Antalya, Turkey, to take a 14-day preparatory training for the start of the season. But on the day of travel coach Jamil Benouahi and some players refused to travel because of their financial dues and also because of the absence of Mustapha Bouchina and the coach's assistant on the travel list, immediately after that USM Alger administration decided to dismiss the coach from his position, In a press conference Reda Abdouche said that traveling to Turkey would have been on a private plane directly to Antalya, and that the place for preparation was very good and that the team would have played five friendly matches, and that the issue of the assistant coach first of all, has not passed his contract yet and he cannot get a ticket. Bouchina the reason is that his passport is removed from the Spanish embassy and immediately after his recovery, he will be transferred to Turkey, and that the matter is not in their hands especially since the diplomatic relations between the two countries are bad, As for the players salaries Abdouche said that the money entered the club's account on 28 July, after the director of Groupe SERPORT signed it. The next day, 14 players, fitness coach Kamel Boudjenane and goalkeeping coach Lounès Gaouaoui signed a document that refused to dismiss Benouahi and demanded the departure of some of those in the administration and the assistant coach Sofiane Benkhelifa who was appointed by the administration, as well as Farid Saffar a person according to the coach and supporters the cause of all the problems and does not have any position in the club. The leaders of USM Alger have put an end to the functions of the technical staff of Benouahi. The coach and his peers, fitness coach Boudjenane and goalkeeper coach Gaouaoui, were dismissed from their posts after a hearing before the disciplinary board. 

On August 4, 2022, USMA contracted with Boualem Charef to be the new coach with his staff, after canceling Turkey's training, it was replaced by another in Tunisia, where the team moved on August 9 with a delegation of 29 players, with the absence of three players, Brahim Benzaza and Samy Bouali for injury and Hamed Belem due to COVID-19. On August 18, the administration of USM Alger agreed with the authorities of Dar El Beïda to receive the current season at Omar Benrabah Stadium in the presence of the supporters and start against MC El Bayadh. On August 22, former ES Sétif captain Akram Djahnit has just signed with USM Alger for the next two seasons as the Latest recruits, Djahnit decided to submitting his case to the National Dispute Resolution Chamber which agreed with him, therefore terminating his contract. On October 19, 2022, former player Tarek Hadj Adlane returned to the club, where he was appointed to head the recruitment and discovery committee, as well as responsible for the club’s media cell. On November 7, USM Alger announced to the public opinion that it had settled the case of coach Denis Lavagne by paying the full financial dues he demanded through "FIFA", USMA considered that the case of Lavane is from the "past", and this file was finally closed after transferring the funds to his account within the legal deadlines set by the "FIFA", and also reassured the supporters that the team will continue to prepare for the upcoming challenges in a normal way including the assignment process. On November 26, 2022, USM Alger announced that its request for domiciliation at Stade du 5 Juillet was rejected by the Office of the Olympic Complex Mohamed Boudiaf and argued its refusal by its desire to keep this enclosure closed until the kick-off of the CHAN 2022. On December 25, 2022, USM Alger terminated the contract with Boualem Charef, with three months compensation, and contracted with Abdelhak Benchikha as a new coach for a year and a half, with Farid Zamiti, assistant, and Farid Belmellat, coach of the goalkeepers.

On January 3, 2023, Madjid Bougherra unveiled the list of 28 players who will represent Algeria at the 2022 African Nations Championship, including nine players from USMA, Belaïd, Loucif, Radouani, Baouche, Chita, Djahnit, Meziane, Mahious and Ait El Hadj, Two-thirds of Algeria's roster is made up of players from CR Belouizdad and USM Alger. In the late match against HB Chelghoum Laïd in the Ligue 1, USM Alger supporters faced problems entering the stadium, accusing the club administration of being the reason. In the 37th minute of the second half the supporters left the stands in protest against them, especially Sid Ahmed Arab and Reda Abdouche. After the end of the match, Abdelhak Benchikha stated that he did not understand the anger of the supporters and that he Satisfied with the performance of his players, especially since in a month they played eight matches.

Pre-season and friendlies

Competitions

Overview

{| class="wikitable" style="text-align: center"
|-
!rowspan=2|Competition
!colspan=8|Record
!rowspan=2|Started round
!rowspan=2|Final position / round
!rowspan=2|First match	
!rowspan=2|Last match
|-
!
!
!
!
!
!
!
!
|-
| Ligue 1

|  
| To be confirmed
| 27 August 2022
| In Progress
|-
| Algerian Cup

| colspan=2| Round of 64 
| colspan=2| 15 February 2023
|-
| Confederation Cup

| Second round
| To be confirmed
| 9 October 2022
| In Progress
|-
! Total

Ligue 1

League table

Results summary

Results by round

Matches
The league fixtures were announced on 19 July 2022.

Algerian Cup

Confederation Cup

Qualifying rounds

In the qualifying rounds, each tie will be played on a home-and-away two-legged basis. If the aggregate score will be tied after the second leg, the away goals rule was applied, and if still tied, extra time will not be played, and the penalty shoot-out will be used to determine the winner (Regulations III. 13 & 14).

Second round

Play-off round

Group stage

The draw for the group stage was held on 12 December 2022, 11:00 GMT (13:00 local time, UTC+2), at the CAF headquarters in Cairo, Egypt. The 16 winners of the play-off round of qualifying were be drawn into four groups of four.

The teams were seeded by their performances in the CAF competitions for the previous five seasons (CAF 5-Year Ranking points shown next to every team). Each group contained one team from each of Pot 1, Pot 2, Pot 3, and Pot 4 and each team was allocated to the positions in their group according to their pot.

Group A

Squad information

Playing statistics

Appearances (Apps.) numbers are for appearances in competitive games only including sub appearances
Red card numbers denote:   Numbers in parentheses represent red cards overturned for wrongful dismissal.
{| class="wikitable sortable alternance"  style="font-size:80%; text-align:center; line-height:14px; width:100%;"
|-
! rowspan="2" style="width:10px;"|No.
! rowspan="2" style="width:10px;"|Nat.
! rowspan="2" scope="col" style="width:275px;"|Player
!colspan="4"|Ligue 1
!colspan="4"|Algerian Cup
!colspan="4"|Confederation Cup
!colspan="4"|Total
|- style="text-align:center;"
!width=40  |
!width=40  |
!width=40  |
!width=40  |
!width=40  |
!width=40  |
!width=40  |
!width=40  |
!width=40  |
!width=40  |
!width=40  |
!width=40  |
!width=40  |
!width=40  |
!width=40  |
!width=40  |
|-
|- align="center"
! colspan="19"| Goalkeepers
|- align="center"
|-
|| 1||||Mohamed Lamine Zemmamouche   
|  ||  ||  ||  || 1 ||  ||  ||  ||  ||  ||  ||  ||  ||  ||  || 
|-
||16||||Imad Benchlef 
| 2 ||  ||  ||  ||  ||  ||  ||  ||  ||  ||  ||  ||  ||  ||  || 
|-
||25||||Oussama Benbot 
| 15 ||  || 2 ||  ||  ||  ||  ||  || 9 ||  ||  ||  ||  ||  ||  || 
|-
|- align="center"
! colspan="19"| Defenders
|- align="center"
|-
|| 2||||Mehdi Beneddine
|  ||  ||  ||  ||  ||  ||  ||  ||  ||  ||  ||  ||  ||  ||  || 
|-
|| 3||||Abdelkader Belharrane
| 1 ||  ||  ||  || 0+1 ||  ||  ||  ||  ||  ||  ||  ||  ||  ||  || 
|-
|| 4||||Zineddine Belaïd
| 16 || 1 || 1 ||  ||  ||  ||  ||  || 9 || 1 ||  ||  ||  ||  ||  || 
|-
|| 5||||Mustapha Bouchina
| 9 ||  || 1 ||  || 0+1 ||  ||  ||  || 1+4 ||  ||  ||  ||  ||  ||  || 
|-
||12||||Haithem Loucif
| 8 ||  ||  ||  || 1 ||  ||  ||  || 3+2 ||  ||  ||  ||  ||  ||  || 
|-
||19||||Saâdi Radouani
| 15 || 2 || 1 ||  ||  ||  ||  ||  || 6 ||  ||  ||  ||  ||  ||  || 
|-
||21||||Adam Alilet
| 11 || 1 || 2 || 1 || 1 ||  ||  ||  || 8 ||  || 3 ||  ||  ||  ||  || 
|-
||22||||Houari Baouche
| 14 ||  || 3 ||  || 1 ||  ||  ||  || 5+1 ||  ||  ||  ||  ||  ||  || 
|-
||27||||Ibrahim Bekakchi
| 4 ||  ||  ||  || 1 ||  ||  ||  ||  ||  ||  ||  ||  ||  ||  || 
|-
||32||||Abdessamed Bounacer
|  ||  ||  ||  ||  ||  ||  ||  || 1 ||  || 1 ||  ||  ||  ||  || 
|-
|- align="center"
! colspan="19"| Midfielders
|- align="center"
|-
|| 6||||Oussama Chita
| 16 || 1 || 1 ||  || 1 ||  ||  ||  || 8+1 ||  || 1 ||  ||  ||  ||  || 
|-
|| 8||||Islam Merili
| 9 || 2 || 2 ||  || 1 ||  ||  ||  || 1+5 || 1 || 1 ||  ||  ||  ||  || 
|-
||14||||Brahim Benzaza
| 7 ||  || 1 ||  || 1 ||  ||  ||  || 3+2 ||  || 2 ||  ||  ||  ||  || 
|-
||15||||Messala Merbah
| 4 || 1 ||  ||  ||  ||  ||  ||  ||  ||  ||  ||  ||  ||  ||  || 
|-
||24||||Taher Benkhelifa
| 14 ||  || 3 || 1 || 0+1 ||  ||  ||  || 9 ||  || 3 ||  ||  ||  ||  || 
|-
||26||||Akram Djahnit
| 16 ||  ||  ||  ||  ||  ||  ||  || 6+1 ||  ||  ||  ||  ||  ||  || 
|-
|- align="center"
! colspan="19"| Forwards
|- align="center"
|-
|| 7||||Ismail Belkacemi 
| 7 ||  || 1 ||  || 1 ||  ||  ||  || 4+5 ||  || 1 ||  ||  ||  ||  || 
|-
|| 9||||Abderrahmane Bacha
| 12 || 1 ||  ||  ||  ||  ||  ||  || 0+4 ||  ||  ||  ||  ||  ||  || 
|-
||10||||Abderrahmane Meziane
| 14 || 3 || 2 ||  ||  ||  ||  ||  || 5+1 || 3 ||  ||  ||  ||  ||  || 
|-
||11||||Abdelkrim Zouari
| 7 || 1 ||  ||  ||  ||  ||  ||  || 1+1 ||  ||  ||  ||  ||  ||  || 
|-
||13||||Hamed Belem
| 4 ||  ||  ||  ||  ||  ||  ||  || 1+3 ||  ||  ||  ||  ||  ||  || 
|-
||13||||Tumisang Orebonye
| 1 ||  ||  ||  ||  ||  ||  ||  || 4+1 || 1 || 1 ||  ||  ||  ||  ||
|-
||17||||Abdesslem Bouchouareb
| 3 || 1 ||  ||  || 0+1 ||  ||  ||  || 0+3 ||  ||  ||  ||  ||  ||  || 
|-
||18||||Aymen Mahious
| 14 || 6 || 1 ||  || 1 || 1 ||  ||  || 8 || 2 ||  ||  ||  ||  ||  || 
|-
||20||||Zakaria Alharaish
| 6 ||  || 1 ||  ||  ||  ||  ||  || 2+1 ||  || 1 ||  ||  ||  ||  || 
|-
||23||||Khaled Bousseliou
| 5 ||  ||  ||  || 0+1 ||  ||  ||  || 4+1 || 2 || 1 ||  ||  ||  ||  || 
|-
||35||||Khalil Darfalou
|  ||  ||  ||  ||  ||  ||  ||  ||  ||  ||  ||  ||  ||  ||  || 
|-
||71||||Abderraouf Othmani
| 9 ||  || 1 ||  || 0+1 || 1 ||  ||  || 0+1 ||  ||  ||  ||  ||  ||  || 
|-
||72||||Mohamed Ait El Hadj
| 15 || 1 || 1  ||  || 1 ||  ||  ||  || 0+5 ||  || 1 ||  ||  ||  ||  || 
|-
||87||||Samy Bouali
| 1 ||  ||  ||  ||  ||  ||  ||  ||   ||  ||   ||  ||  ||  ||  || 
|-
|- class="sortbottom"
|colspan="3" |Own goals
|! style="background:white; text-align: center;" |
| 1
|! colspan="3" style="background:white; text-align: center;" |
| 0
|! colspan="3" style="background:white; text-align: center;" |
| 2
|! colspan="3" style="background:white; text-align: center;" |
| 3
|! colspan="2" style="background:white; text-align: center;" |
|- class="sortbottom"
|colspan="4"  style="background:white; text-align: center;" |Totals
|22 ||24  ||2 
|! rowspan="2" style="background:white; text-align: center;" |
|2 ||1 ||0 
|! rowspan="2" style="background:white; text-align: center;" |
|11 ||13 ||0 
|! rowspan="2" style="background:white; text-align: center;" |
|35 ||38 ||2

Goalscorers

Includes all competitive matches. The list is sorted alphabetically by surname when total goals are equal.

Penalties

Clean sheets

Includes all competitive matches.

Squad list
Players and squad numbers last updated on 25 August 2022.Note: Flags indicate national team as has been defined under FIFA eligibility rules. Players may hold more than one non-FIFA nationality.

Transfers

In

Summer

Winter

Out

Summer

Winter

New contracts

Notes

References

2022-23
Algerian football clubs 2022–23 season